In October 1969 a new division was formed in Taizhou, Jiangsu province. In December 1969 it was designated as 74th Army Division(). The division was then composed of:
220th Infantry Regiment;
221st Infantry Regiment;
222nd Infantry Regiment;
Artillery Regiment.

The division was under direct command and control of Armored Troops, Nanjing Military Region.

On April 4th, 1975, the divisional HQ was transferred to Jiangsu Provincial Military District and became the divisional HQ of 1st Independent Division of Jiangsu Provincial Military District. The Staff Command of Wenzhou Military Sub-district was transferred in and became the new divisional HQ.

In May 1976 the division was disbanded.

References

Infantry divisions of the People's Liberation Army
Military units and formations disestablished in 1976
Military units and formations established in 1969